Tryavna Municipality is a municipality (obshtina) in Gabrovo Province, North-central Bulgaria, located on the northern slopes of the central Stara planina mountain to the area of the so-called Fore-Balkan. It is named after its administrative centre - the town of Tryavna.

The area is best known with the Bulgarian National Revival architectural complex in the main town.

Settlements 

(towns are shown in bold):
Population (December 2009)

 Tryavna - Трявна - 9,831
 Azmanite - Азманите - 4
 Armyankovtsi - Армянковци - 4
 Bangeytsi - Бангейци - 34
 Bahretsi - Бахреци - 18
 Belitsa - Белица - 54
 Bizhovtsi - Бижовци - 13
 Brezhnitsite - Брежниците - 13
 Bardarite - Бърдарите - 4
 Bardeni - Бърдени - 6
 Chakalite - Чакалите - 4
 Chernovrah - Черновръх - 78
 Daevtsi - Даевци - 6
 Dimievtsi - Димиевци - 3
 Dobrevtsi - Добревци - 12
 Dolni Radkovtsi - Долни Радковци - 0
 Donchovtsi - Дончовци - 6
 Dragnevtsi - Драгневци - 10
 Drandarite - Драндарите - 3
 Darvari - Дървари - 0
 Daskarite - Дъскарите - 0
 Enchovtsi - Енчовци - 19
 Farevtsi - Фъревци - 3
 Fartuni - Фъртуни - 0
 Hristovtsi - Христовци - 7
 Kashentsi - Кашенци - 5
 Kerenite - Керените - 3
 Kiselkovtsi - Киселковци - 0
 Kisiytsite - Кисийците - 44
 Koevtsi - Коевци - 0
 Koychovtsi - Койчовци - 5
 Kolyu Ganev - Колю Ганев - 0
 Konarskoto - Конарското - 0
 Kreslyuvtsi - Креслювци - 5
 Krastets - Кръстец - 28
 Krastenyatsite - Кръстеняците - 0
 Kartipanya - Къртипъня - 0
 Malki Stanchovtsi - Малки Станчовци - 13
 Malchovtsi - Малчовци - 3
 Manevtsi - Маневци - 12
 Marutsekovtsi - Маруцековци - 0
 Mateshovtsi - Матешовци - 2
 Milevtsi - Милевци - 11
 Mrazetsi - Мръзеци - 13
 Nenovtsi - Неновци - 0
 Nikachkovtsi - Никачковци - 0
 Nikolaevo - Николаево - 11
 Nozherite - Ножерите - 3
 Noseite - Носеите - 6
 Okoliite - Околиите - 8
 Oshanite - Ошаните - 5
 Pavlevtsi - Павлевци - 0
 Planintsi - Планинци - 0
 Plachkovtsi - Плачковци - 1,930
 Pobak - Побък - 0
 Popgergevtsi - Попгергевци - 1
 Prestoy - Престой - 42
 Parzhigrah - Пържиграх - 0
 Radevtsi - Радевци - 57
 Radino - Радино - 3
 Raevtsi - Раевци - 2
 Raynushkovtsi - Райнушковци - 4
 Ralevtsi - Ралевци - 2
 Rachovtsi - Рачовци - 0
 Rashovite - Рашовите - 2
 Ruevtsi - Руевци - 10
 Svirtsi - Свирци - 4
 Sechen kamak - Сечен камък - 7
 Skortsite - Скорците - 2
 Staynovtsi - Стайновци - 5
 Stanchov Han - Станчов хан - 38
 Strazhata - Стражата - 0
 Stramtsi - Стръмци - 2
 Tomchevtsi - Томчевци - 3
 Yabalkovtsi - Ябълковци - 0
 Yavor - Явор - 2
 Yovovtsi - Йововци - 1
 Zelenika - Зеленика - 1

Demography 
The following table shows the change of the population during the last four decades.

Religion
According to the latest Bulgarian census of 2011, the religious composition, among those who answered the optional question on religious identification, was the following:

See also
Provinces of Bulgaria
Municipalities of Bulgaria
List of cities and towns in Bulgaria

References

External links
 Official website 

Municipalities in Gabrovo Province